Club de Fútbol Nacional de Tijuana was a Mexican football team that played in the Primera Division 'A' of before their disappearance. They played their games in the city of Tijuana, Baja California, Mexico.

They managed to be in the Primera Division 'A' in the year 1999, which was composed primarily of Mexicans, something very representative since that year that most of the players were from Tijuana who attempted to promote the team to Primera Division.

History
After the relegation of Colibríes from Primera Division in Clausura 2003, the team was possessed by the Mexican Federation of Association Football because the team had not paid the fines imposed by Jorge Rodriguez Marié. The franchise was sold and became Dorados de Tijuana, the eleventh before was known simply as Trotamundos Tijuana. As the team was made by Mexican Federation of Association Football the owners were forced to create another team in the same region and that was how the Nacional de Tijuana team emerged.

Before then, Nacional de Tijuana was the name of the successor of Chivas Tijuana after the Federación de Fútbol Mexicano decided in 1999 that there could not be two clubs called Chivas.

 Then the team had a bad season and dragged the issue of the percentage of the old franchise, causing it to relegate to Segunda División de México, soon to be gone from Primera Division A' due to the increase in teams.

Stadium

Previous Teams
The following teams were based in Tijuana and disappeared due to their franchise was bought or their relegation to Segunda División de México:

 Club Tijuana: Changed owner and name to Dorados de Tijuana.
 Chivas Tijuana: Subsidiary of Chivas.
 Trotamundos Tijuana: Converted to Trotamundos Salamanca.
 Tijuana Stars.
 Inter Tijuana.

External links
Sitio Web oficial
Página de la porra de Dorados

Footnotes

Ascenso MX teams